XHESOL-FM is a radio station on 103.9 FM in El Jaral, Ciudad Hidalgo, Michoacán. XHESOL is owned by Medios Radiofónicos Michoacán and carries a grupera format known as Radio Sol.

History
XHESOL began as XESOL-AM 1190, which was owned by Maximiliano García Tellez. It moved to FM in 2011.

References

Radio stations in Michoacán